Vertical Race is a 1982 Soviet three-part crime miniseries directed by Aleksander Muratov based on the story of the same name by the Vayner Brothers.

Plot
The action takes place in the USSR in the 1980s. The plot is based on the confrontation between Moscow Criminal Investigations Department inspector Stanislav Tikhonov (Andrey Myagkov) and the thief-recidivist Alexei Dedushkin, nicknamed "Baton" (Valentin Gaft).

Officers of the investigations department detain a criminal with an imported suitcase packed with foreign things among which they find the Order of St. Andrew, but due to insufficient evidence (no report of theft), they have to let "Baton" go. He is at large and continues to pursue criminal activities. He begins to feel threatened, starts to steal fur hats and coats from a store, commits a theft in the apartment of a retired general, where, in addition to the savings book, "Baton" also takes the revolver and cartridges. Taking the thief into custody becomes a matter of principle to Tikhonov, he carefully collects the evidence, and Dedushkin has nowhere to go. The cornered criminal is ready to use weapons against a police officer.

Cast
Andrey Myagkov - Stanislav Tikhonov, investigator
Valentin Gaft - Lyokha Dedushkin, thief-recidivist named "Baton"
Vladimir Salnikov - Alexander Saveliev, Tikhonov's assistant (voiced by Aleksandr Ryzhkov)
Nikolai Zasukhin - Vladimir Ivanovich Sharapov, the head of Tikhonov
Galina Polskikh - Zosia, a friend of the "Baton"
Irina Brazgovka - Lyudmila Mihailovna Roznina, an employee of the archive
Elena Kapitsa - Lena, Tikhonov's former beloved
Stanislav Chekan - captain of militsiya, the duty officer of the bullpen
Vyacheslav Zholobov - Igor Ivanov, administrator of "Racing in the vertical"
Valery Durov - phalerist
Iraida Stroumova - director of the archive (voiced by Yevgeniya Khanayeva)
Alexander Valkovich - Alexander Mikhailovich, archivist
Zinaida Dekhtyaryova - Tikhonov's mother (voiced by Yevgeniya Uralova)
Kapitolina Ilenko - Elizaveta Henrichovna von Dietz (Boyko)
Vasily Korzun - Oleg Nikolayevich Lebedev, chief of the Ministry of Internal Affairs (voiced by Nikolai Grabbe)
Boris Bityukov - "The Shaman"
Vladimir Druzhnikov - Alexey Y. Uvnarskiy, Surgeon
Ninel Myshkova - Valentina, wife of Obnorsky
Vladimir Koval - Signor Costelli
Valery Nosik - airport employee, former accomplice of "Baton"
Viktor Miroshnichenko - Bakum, taxi driver

References

External links

1982 crime drama films
1982 television films
1982 films
1980s crime films
Dovzhenko Film Studios films
Soviet crime films
Soviet crime television series
Soviet television films
Soviet television miniseries
Russian crime television series